(born August 4, 1998) is a Japanese racing driver. He currently competes in Super GT for Team Mugen and in Super Formula for TCS Nakajima Racing.

Career

Early career
Oyu made his motorsport debut in karting in 2007. He raced mainly in Japan and won a number of championships there. In 2015, he made his formula racing debut in the Super FJ Okayama Challenge Cup, which he won. In 2016, he made the move to the JAF Japanese Formula 4 Championship, where he became champion in both the Western and Eastern divisions. He also competed in the Japanese Formula 4 Championship with the Rn-sports team. He won two races at the Sportsland SUGO and the Suzuka International Racing Course and also took the podium at the Twin Ring Motegi. With 126 points, he finished third in the standings behind Ritomo Miyata and Sena Sakaguchi.

In 2017, Oyu continued to drive in Japanese Formula 4 Championship, moving to the HFDP team as a Honda protégé. He took three wins at Autopolis, Fuji Speedway and Motegi and took four other podium finishes. However, he also had a number of retirements, eventually finishing fourth in the final standings with 166 points, behind Ritomo Miyata, Ukyo Sasahara and Yuki Tsunoda.

Formula 3
In 2018, Oyu made the move to the Japanese Formula 3 Championship, racing for the TODA Racing. He took four podium finishes at SUGO, the Okayama International Circuit and Motegi (twice) and finished sixth in the overall standings with 39 points. At the end of the season, he made his debut for Toda in the Macau Grand Prix, finishing sixteenth.

In 2019, Oyu remained active in Japanese Formula 3 with TODA. He won a race at SUGO and took five other podium finishes. With 60 points he finished fourth in the championship behind Sacha Fenestraz, Ritomo Miyata and Enaam Ahmed. He also drove his first races in Europe at the Silverstone Euroformula Open round with Team Motopark, replacing Yuki Tsunoda, who at the time was participating in the FIA Formula 3 Championship. Oyu took pole position and victory in both races to earn 52 championship points, which were enough to claim fourteenth place in the final standings.

Super Formula & Super GT
In 2020, Oyu made his debut in both Super Formula with the TCS Nakajima Racing team and in the GT300 class of the Super GT with ARTA in a Honda NSX GT3 Evo. In Super Formula he had a difficult start but at the end of the season he won a race at Suzuka and took a podium at Fuji to finish sixth in the championship with 41 points. In the Super GT, he shared the car with Shinichi Takagi and Nobuharu Matsushita, with whom he took two podium finishes at Fuji. He finished fourth overall with 45 points.

In 2021, Oyu remained active in Super Formula with Nakajima, and moved to the GT500 class within Super GT, where he shared the car with Ukyo Sasahara at Team Red Bull Mugen.

Racing record

Career summary

*Season still in progress

Complete Macau Grand Prix results

Complete Super Formula results

* Season still in progress

Complete Super GT results

‡ Half points awarded as less than 75% of race distance was completed.
* Season still in progress

References

External links
 
 

1998 births
Living people
Japanese racing drivers
Super Formula drivers
Super GT drivers

Japanese Formula 3 Championship drivers
Euroformula Open Championship drivers
Motopark Academy drivers
Nakajima Racing drivers
Mugen Motorsports drivers
Team Aguri drivers
Japanese F4 Championship drivers